The Reversible Destiny Foundation is an artists-architects-poets group formed by Madeline Gins and Shusaku Arakawa. The Foundation’s work concerns the body, its simultaneously specific and non-specific relation to its surroundings. The philosophical findings of what a body or person is directs their architectural theories and works. The Foundation plans to collaborate with practitioners in a wide range of disciplines including but not limited to experimental biology, neuroscience, quantum physics, experimental phenomenology, and medicine. Their architectural projects have included residences, parks and plans for housing complexes and neighborhoods.

History and philosophy

Beginning in 1963, Arakawa and Madeline Gins collaborated to produce visionary, boundary-defying art and architecture. Their work, The Mechanism of Meaning, the first large-scale art-science research project, has been exhibited widely throughout the world and has influenced later developments. The Mechanism of Meaning was published as a book in 1971. In 1987, as a means of financing the design and construction of works of procedural architecture that draw on The Mechanism of Meaning, extending its theoretical implications into the environment, Arakawa and Gins founded the Architectural Body Research Foundation. The Reversible Destiny Foundation was formed in 2010.

Key ideas and terminology

Architectural body

An architectural body is a unit of measurement: Human Body + Its Immediate Surrounds. Contrasted to conventional notions of the body that purport clear boundaries, the architectural body holds that boundaries can only be suggested. From the term 'architectural body,' three hypotheses arise:

 Architectural body hypothesis or sited awareness hypothesis: What stems from the body, by way of awareness, should be held to be of it. Any site at which a person deems an X to exist should be considered a contributing segment of her awareness.
 Insufficiently procedural bioscleave hypothesis: It is because we are creatures of an insufficiently procedural bioscleave that the human lot remains untenable.
 Closely argued built-discourse: Adding carefully sequenced sets of architectural procedures (closely argued ones) to bioscleave will, by making it more procedurally sufficient, reconfigure supposed inevitability.

Organism that persons

The phrase 'organism that persons' describes the impressions an organism expresses, and thereby resulting in the organism being the type of organism it is. As an ontological phenomenon, it is manifested in all organisms; for example, a dog is an organism that dogs and a cat is an organism that cats.

Procedural architecture

Procedural architecture is defined in Architectural Body (2002). Understanding procedural architecture is clarified by the notion of procedural knowing, i.e. the reduction of steps necessary to complete a routine, and making those steps a subroutine of that procedure. Walking, talking, and eating are examples of procedural knowing.

Procedural architecture brings into question an occupant’s procedures and steers her to minutely examine the actions, or subroutines, she takes, thereby causing her to doubt herself long enough to find a way to reinvent herself.

Conference

There have been three conferences. Established thinkers from diverse intellectual disciplines, including such names as Lawrence Alloway, Robert Creeley, Italo Calvino, Carter Ratcliff, Donald Kuspit, Arthur Danto, Suzanne Blier, Hans-Georg Gadamer, Jean-Francois Lyotard,  Andrew Benjamin, Ed Keller, Kay Itoi and Nicholas Piombino, Mark C. Taylor, George Lakoff, Jean-Jacques Lecercle, Reuben Baron, Hideo Kawamoto, Shuzo Takeguchi and Erin Manning, have all pondered the significance of Arakawa and Gins’ output with reference to philosophy of mind and language, visual art and aesthetics, poetry and literary theory, cognitive science, architecture, dance and movement, social and ecological psychology—and many other fields.

Completed projects

Bioscleave House (Lifespan Extending Villa) 

(East Hampton, New York, 2000–2008)

The Bioscleave House is the first architectural project that the Reversible Destiny Foundation completed in the United States. Its construction spanned almost a decade, encountering obstacles from its initial funder, and ultimately cost over two million dollars. The house has four rooms, a free-form living space and walls made of various materials, such as metal and translucent polycarbonate. There are no internal doors.
The room has levels and makes the visitor feel like they are in two places at once. That violates the idea of what a room should be, and by changing the idea of how architecture should work, people may be changing their ideas about how life should work. The Bioscleave House draws its name from the way a body holds, or cleaves, to these surroundings.

Reversible Destiny Houses – Mitaka

(Mitaka, Tokyo, Japan Completed October 2005)

The Reversible Destiny Lofts – Mitaka (In Memory of Helen Keller) is a nine-unit multiple dwelling. It was first completed as an example of procedural architecture put to residential use. These lofts reflexively articulate the residents’ operative tendencies and coordinating skills essential to and determinative of human thought and behavior; which means to say, the lofts manage, by virtue of how they are constructed, to reveal to their residents the ins and outs of what makes a person, in this case the resident. This is the same set of tendencies and skills to which Arakawa and Madeline Gins gave diagrammatic form in their decades-long research project The Mechanism of Meaning.

Built by Takenaka Corp., a leading Japanese contractor, the apartments actually meet every building-code requirement. Through its construction, the Reversible Destiny Lofts – Mitaka (In Memory of Helen Keller) invite optimistic and constructive action to help residents live long and ample lives.

Site of Reversible Destiny – Yoro 

(Yoro, Gifu Prefecture, Japan, 1993–1995)

Opened in October 1995, the Site of Reversible Destiny - Yoro Park is an "experience park" conceived on the theme of encountering the unexpected. By guiding visitors through various unexpected experiences as they walk through its component areas, the site offers them opportunities to rethink their physical and spiritual orientation to the world.  The site consists of a main pavilion, the Critical Resemblance House, the Elliptical Field and the Reversible Destiny Office.

The Critical Resemblance House has a roof that is shaped as a map of Gifu Prefecture, offering visitors a range of perceptual and cognitive experiences. The interior, a maze-like configuration that can be entered and exited at numerous points, has household furniture―sofas, beds, kitchen sinks―arranged in corresponding pairs on the floor, under the floor, and on the ceiling.

The Elliptical Field, which is a large, bowl-shaped basin, consists of nine pavilions (each a reproduction of a segment of the Critical Resemblance House), an array of complementary mounds and hollows, five maps of varying sizes of the Japanese archipelago, and, weaving in between all of these, an intricate network of 148 paths. The largest of the Japan maps, which extends across the entire Field, is planted with 24 species of medicinal herbs that give it a gradually changing complexion from season to season.

The Reversible Destiny Office was added in April 1997. It houses information about the site, Arakawa's drawings and other works, and screens a documentary about the site's construction.

Ubiquitous Site * Nagi’s Ryoanji * Architectural Body

(Nagi Museum Of Contemporary Art, Japan 1994)

The small entrance room, the stairway, and the cylindrical room present an exercise in perception and physical experience. The balance between self-consciousness and perception of one's body is broken down, the "axis" shifts, consciousness leans out, is "doubled," and "something" emerges. This "something" existed in the perceptions of the newborn child that has been forgotten in growing up. People's roots are found in what might be described as "insecurity," "faith," or "heart." It might be called "nostalgia," a certain "atmosphere." The artists speak of artificially creating "instant nostalgia." It is artificially constructed, using something "given," breaking through the logjam of words found in modern thought. They conduct experiments which deal more with the possibilities of physical structures and the human body than of words. It is up to the viewer to determine what is made to happen or actually happens here, and what can be gained from it.

Works in progress

Healing Fun House at BOOM: Palm Springs Desert Community

Books by Arakawa and Gins

 Word Rain (Gins, 1969)
 The Mechanism of Meaning (Arakawa & Gins, 1971) Minneapolis Institute of Arts, [©1979]. 
 Intend (Gins, 1973)  
 What the President Will Say and Do (Gins, 1984)  Barrytown, N.Y. : Station Hill, ©1984  
 To Not to Die [poetry] (Gins, 1987), Tōkyō : Riburo Pōto, 1988 
 Architecture: Sites of Reversible Destiny (Arakawa & Gins, 1994) London : Academy Editions, 1994 
 Helen Keller or Arakawa (Gins, 1994) (originally published as ヘレン・ケラーまたは荒川修作 / Heren kera matawa arakawa shusaku)
 Helen Keller ou Arakawa. Portrait de l'artiste en jeune aveugle  (Gins, trans. Marie D Garnier, Hermann 2016)
 Reversible Destiny (Arakawa & Gins, 1997)  New York (NY) : Guggenheim Museum, 1997. 
 Architectural Body (Arakawa & Gins, 2002) Tuscaloosa : University of Alabama Press, ©2002.  
 Making Dying Illegal (Arakawa & Gins, 2006)  New York : Roof Books, ©2006.

Films

 Why Not (A Serenade of Eschatological Ecology) (1969)
 For Example (A Critique of Never) (1971)

References

Notes

External links
Reversible Destiny Foundation Official Website
BOOM! Palm Springs Community Website

Organizations based in New York (state)
1987 establishments in New York (state)
Visionary environments